The Capnodiaceae are a family of fungi in the Ascomycota, class Dothideomycetes. Species in the family have a widespread distribution, and are especially prevalent in tropical and subtropical areas, as well as temperate rainforests.

Genera
The following genera are included in the placement in Capnodiaceae; several genera have a tentative placement in the family.

Aithaloderma  – tentative
Anopeltis  – tentative
Antennariella 
Callebaea  – tentative
Capnodaria 
Capnodium 
Capnophaeum  – tentative
Ceramoclasteropsis  – tentative
Chaetocapnodium 
Conidiocarpus 
Conidioxyphium 
Echinothecium  – tentative
Fumagospora 
Fumiglobus 
Hyaloscolecostroma  – tentative
Leptoxyphium Spegazzini 1918
Microxyphium 
Phragmocapnias 
Polychaeton  – tentative
Readerielliopsis 
Scoriadopsis  – tentative
Scorias 
Trichomerium 
Tripospermum

References

 
Dothideomycetes families